Freda Nellie Skinner (31 January 1911 – 19 July 1993) was a British sculptor and woodcarver who was head of sculpture at Wimbledon School of Art  from 1945 to 1971.

Skinner was born in Warlingham, Surrey, where her father, Norman, had a farm; she showed an early interest in art at age 11 with a pair of paintings of a prized Champion Devon Red bull and a cow. She studied under Henry Moore and Alan Durst at The Royal College of Art, her course fees being met, in part, by neighbours including Ethel and Sybil Pye. She then went on to teach toy making and sculpture at Kingston School of Art, and was head of sculpture at Wimbledon School of Art 1945 to 1971.

She was a Fellow of the Royal Society of British Sculptors and a member of the Society of Portrait Sculptors.

Her 1972 sculpture Virgin and Child is in the Lady Chapel of St Elphege's Church, Wallington, south London. She also carved the foundation stone for the Barbican Art Centre in central London, in 1972. She exhibited at the Royal Academy Summer Exhibition six times, and also at the Architects Association, Holland Park Orangery, Mall Galleries, The London Group, Suffolk Galleries, Bruton Street Gallery and Wykeham Galleries.

In 1993 there was a retrospective exhibition of her work at the Bruton Street Gallery in central London. Two of her jigsaw works for Abbatt Toys are held in the V&A.

In 1944 she was recorded living at The Ivy House, French Street, Sunbury-on-Thames, then at 35 Deodar Road, Putney, from the late 1940s to about 1981. She moved to Amesbury in Wiltshire in 1981 and died in West Amesbury, Wiltshire on 19 July 1993.

Gallery

Works exhibited at the Royal Academy

Selected works

Bibliography
Woodcarving (1961) New York: Sterling Pub. Co

References

1911 births
1993 deaths
20th-century British sculptors
British women sculptors
Alumni of the Royal College of Art
Academics of Wimbledon College of Arts
People from Surrey